The 2009 Eurocup Mégane Trophy season was the fifth Eurocup Mégane Trophy season. The season began at Circuit de Catalunya on 18 April and finished at the Ciudad del Motor de Aragón on 25 October, after seven rounds and fourteen races. Mike Verschuur won the title, having battled Jonathan Hirschi for the entire campaign.

Teams and drivers

Calendar

Race calendar and results

Championship standings

References

External links
The Eurocup Mégane Trophy website

Eurocup Mégane Trophy seasons
Eurocup Megane Trophy